Welcher may refer to:

Welcher & Welcher, Australian sitcom
Dan Welcher (born 1948), American composer